Evelyn Beatrice Sainte Croix Fleming,  Rose, known as Eve Fleming (10 January 1885 – 27 July 1964), was an English socialite known for her flamboyant beauty and being the mother of James Bond writer Ian Fleming.

Life
Born in Kensington, London, Eve was the daughter of George Alfred Sainte Croix Rose (31 January 1854 – 14 February 1926), a captain in the service of the Royal Buckinghamshire Militia (King's Own) and Justice of the Peace (J.P.) for Berkshire, son of the 1st Baronet Rose, of Rayners, by his marriage on 8 April 1880 to Beatrice Quain (1857 – 4 January 1911), the daughter of Sir Richard Quain, 1st Baronet, graduated with a Doctor of Medicine (M.B.). 

On 15 February 1906 she married Valentine Fleming (17 February 1882 – 20 May 1917), and by that marriage was the mother of four sons: Peter Fleming, Ian Fleming – author of the James Bond books, Richard Fleming and Michael Fleming. Eve was also the grandmother of actress Lucy Fleming. 

After her husband's death in action during World War I, Eve Fleming inherited his large estate in trust, making her very wealthy. However, the conditions of the money in trust transferred it to others should she ever remarry. She became the mistress of painter Augustus John, with whom she had a daughter, the cellist Amaryllis Fleming, and later lived with the Marquess of Winchester until his death.

During the 1940s and 1950s, she resided at The Abbey, Sutton Courtenay. She died only two weeks before the death of her son Ian on 12 August 1964.

In popular culture
Eve Fleming's nickname from her son Ian was M and Ian may have used his relationship with her as model for M, fictional head of Head of the Secret Intelligence Service and James Bond's boss.

References 

Notes

Bibliography

 Lycett, Andrew. 'Fleming, Ian Lancaster (1908–1964)', Oxford Dictionary of National Biography, Oxford University Press, Sept 2004; online edn, Jan 2008. Retrieved 3 June 2008.

1885 births
1964 deaths
Evelyn
John family